Edward Cotter may refer to:
 Edward Cotter (politician) (1902–1972), Irish Fianna Fáil politician
 Edward Cotter (athlete), Canadian long-distance runner
 Ed Cotter (1904–1959), Major League Baseball player
 Edward M. Cotter (fireboat), a fireboat in use in Buffalo, New York